Forum business magazine (Affärsmagasinet Forum, Forum för ekonomi och teknik) is a monthly magazine published in print and online. It is Finland's only Swedish-language business, technology and management publication.

Forum focuses on how emerging technologies affect the economy and society from a career and management perspective. Coverage areas include entrepreneurship and innovations in Finland and the Nordic area, as well as the Baltics, the US and Asia. The magazine reaches 27,000 well-educated readers in management positions, mainly business graduates, engineers and architects, both in Finland and abroad.

Roughly 76% of readers work in management positions or as entrepreneurs.

History and profile
Forum was founded in 1968 through a merger of various technology and business publications whose roots stretch back to 1880. Forum's stated mission is to act as an ”independent liberal magazine, editorially free from any party or organization, striving to promote a spirit of humanistic enlightenment, democracy, open and transparent business, as well as innovation and entrepreneurship”. Torsten Fagerholm is editor-in-chief since 2013. His predecessors include Patrik Lindfors, Fredrik Nars and Ragnhild Artimo.

References

External links

1968 establishments in Finland
Business magazines published in Finland
Magazines established in 1968
Magazines published in Helsinki
Monthly magazines published in Finland
Swedish-language magazines